"Death a la Carte" is the thirteenth episode of the third series of the 1960s cult British spy-fi television series The Avengers, starring Patrick Macnee and Honor Blackman. It was first broadcast by ABC on 21 December 1963. The episode was directed by Kim Mills and written by John Lucarotti.

Plot
Steed and Cathy are assigned to protect the Emir Abdulla Akaba during his trade visit to London, but despite their best efforts in food service he is assassinated. The Avengers must discover who and what killed him.

Cast
 Patrick Macnee as John Steed
 Honor Blackman as Cathy Gale
 Robert James as Brigadier Mellor 
 Henry Soskin as Emir Abdulla Akaba
 Paul Dawkins as Dr. Sir Ralph Spender 
 Ken Parry as Arbuthnot 
 Gordon Rollings as Lucien Chaplet 
 David Nettheim as Umberto Equi 
 Coral Atkins as Josie 
 Valentino Musetti as Ali

References

External links

Episode overview on The Avengers Forever! website

The Avengers (season 3) episodes
1963 British television episodes